Hopeless Hopes is Martyr's debut full-length album. It was released independently on November 5, 1997. A remastered re-issue was released by Galy Records in October 2006 with four extra tracks.

Track list

Personnel
 Daniel Mongrain  - clean vocals, guitar
 Pier-Luc Lampron - guitar
 François Mongrain - bass, death growls
 François Richard - drums, percussion

References

1997 albums
Martyr (band) albums
Galy Records albums